Chris Masoe (born 15 May 1979 in Savaii, Western Samoa) is a former New Zealand rugby union footballer, who last played for Racing Metro 92 in the Top 14 and a current professional boxer. He is the brother of boxer Maselino Masoe. He was born on the island of Savai'i

Career

Early life
Masoe was born in Savai'i, Western Samoa as the second youngest of 13 children. He emigrated to New Zealand aged 8 and was raised in Wanganui.

Super 14
Masoe used to play for the Wellington Hurricanes in the Super 14. He appeared in all 11 Hurricanes matches in the 2005 season. He is capable of playing in all three loose-forward positions but has been concentrating on the openside flanker's role. Masoe has good pace and is a strong ball runner and a tough defender.

Sevens
He has been a regular member of the New Zealand Sevens squad in the past and was a member of the 2002 Commonwealth Games gold-winning team.

Handbag incident
On the night of the Super 14 final on 27 May 2006, former All Black captain Tana Umaga struck Hurricanes team mate Chris Masoe over the head with a woman's handbag, breaking her cell phone, after Masoe allegedly attempted to strike another patron. Masoe was fined $3000 by the NZRU as punishment.

Castres Olympique
In 2008, he signed a contract for French Top 14 team Castres Olympique. In 2010, he was selected in the French Barbarians squad to play Tonga on 26 November.

Toulon
In April 2012 it was confirmed Masoe was joining RC Toulonnais on a three-year deal. In May 2013 he started as Toulon won the 2013 Heineken Cup Final by 16–15 against Clermont Auvergne.

Awards
His allround ability earned him the Taranaki Sportsman of the Year in 2002 and in the same year he was named New Zealand Sevens Player of the Year. Following his last season at Castres Olympique, he received the 2011–2012 Top 14 rugbyman of the year award on 15 October 2012.

Honours
 Racing 92
Top 14: 2015–16

Professional boxing career

On December 2nd 2022, Masoe followed in his brothers footsteps and made his professional boxing debut against Hawaian born Lui Te'o. Masoe won the fight by Split Decision.

Professional boxing record

References

External links
 
 
 
 

1979 births
New Zealand international rugby union players
Living people
New Zealand rugby union players
Rugby union flankers
Rugby union number eights
Commonwealth Games gold medallists for New Zealand
Rugby sevens players at the 2002 Commonwealth Games
New Zealand male rugby sevens players
Samoan emigrants to New Zealand
Expatriate rugby union players in France
Hurricanes (rugby union) players
Taranaki rugby union players
Wellington rugby union players
Castres Olympique players
RC Toulonnais players
New Zealand expatriate rugby union players
New Zealand expatriate sportspeople in France
New Zealand international rugby sevens players
Commonwealth Games rugby sevens players of New Zealand
Commonwealth Games medallists in rugby sevens
Medallists at the 2002 Commonwealth Games